The 1998 Buffalo Bills season was the team's 39th season, and 29th in the National Football League. The season marked an important development in the Bills’ history as a quarterback controversy would consume the whole season between Rob Johnson and Doug Flutie. It would also mark the beginning of the Wade Phillips era. The Bills improved on the previous season's output of 6–10, and finished second in the AFC East with a 10–6 record, and would qualify for the playoffs only to lose in the wild card round to the Miami Dolphins.

The Bills lost their first three games of the season, all by six points or less, and looked to be headed for a losing season. After a bye in Week Four, quarterback Rob Johnson finally won his first game with Buffalo, holding on for a 26–21 win over San Francisco in Week Five. Flutie started the next eleven games, winning nine of them. The Bills had a playoff spot locked up by the final game of the season, which Johnson started and won.

The Bills played the Dolphins in the Wild Card round of the 1998 AFC Playoffs, where wide receiver Eric Moulds would set the NFL playoff record for receiving yards, with 240. The Bills would end up losing the game 24–17, as Dolphins lineman Trace Armstrong sacked Flutie on Buffalo's last drive, forcing him to fumble, and icing the game for Miami.

Offseason 
The Bills, looking to upgrade the quarterback position, signed Rob Johnson, who had played for Jacksonville in 1997, and improved his stock with a win in relief of Jaguars quarterback Mark Brunell. Bills general manager John Butler traded away the Bills' first- and fourth-round picks to Jacksonville for the rights to Johnson.

The Bills also signed long-time CFL quarterback Doug Flutie to back up Johnson; Flutie would end the 1998 season with the NFL Comeback Player of the Year Award.

NFL draft

Personnel

Staff

Roster

Regular season 
The opening game for 1998 constituted the first time since 1985 that the Bills played the San Diego Chargers. The reason for this is that before the admission of the Texans in 2002, NFL scheduling formulas for games outside a team's division were much more influenced by table position during the previous season.

Schedule 

Note: Intra-division opponents are in bold text.

Week 1 
Starting QBs: Buffalo: Rob Johnson (American football) ** Johnson left with a concussion with the Bills trailing 10-0. **

San Diego Chargers: Ryan Leaf ** 1st NFL Start **

Vegas Line: San Diego Chargers -1.5

Over/Under:41.0 (under)

Week 2 
Week 2 at Miami Dolphins
 Score: L 13-7
 Date: September 13, 1998
 Stadium: Pro Player Stadium, Miami FL
 Start Time: 1PM ET/10AM PT
 Attendance: 73,097
 Weather: 82 degrees, 10% chance of rain
 TV: CBS
 Announcers: Ian Eagle and Mark May
Week 3 vs St Louis Rams
 Score: L 33-34
 Date: September 20, 1998
 Stadium: Rich Stadium, Orchard Park, NY
 Start Time: 1PM ET/10AM PT
 Attendance: 65,199
 Weather: 72 degrees, sunny, wind 10 mph
 TV: Fox
 Announcers: Kenny Albert and Tim Green
Week 4 Bye

Week 5 vs San Francisco 49ers
 Score: W 26-21
 Date: October 4, 1998
 Stadium: Rich Stadium, Orchard Park, NY
 Start Time: 1PM ET/10AM PT
 Attendance: 76,615
 Weather: 50 degrees, cloudy
 TV: Fox
 Announcers: Ray Bentley and Ron Pitts
Week 6 at Indianapolis Colts
 Score: W 31-24
 Date: October 11, 1998
 Stadium: RCA Dome, Indianapolis IN
 Start Time: 1PM ET/10AM PT
 Attendance: 52,938
 Weather: Dome
 TV: CBS
 Announcers: Bill Macatee and John Dockery
Week 7 vs Jacksonville Jaguars
 Score: W 17-16
 Date: October 18, 1998
 Stadium: Rich Stadium, Orchard Park, NY
 Start Time: 1PM ET/10AM PT
 Attendance: 77,635
 Weather: 68 degrees, sunny
 TV: CBS
 Announcers: Greg Gumbel and Phil Simms

Week 8

Week 10

Week 14 

First meeting of the two clubs in Cincinnati since the 1988 AFC Championship Game.

Starting QBs: Buffalo: Doug Flutie

Cincinnati: Neil O'Donnell 
Vegas Line:	Buffalo Bills -4.5

Over/Under:	43.0 (over)

On the first play from scrimmage, Eric Moulds became the 20th Player in Bills History With 50+ Receptions In A Season, as he caught a 55 yard reception from Doug Flutie.

Week 15 
Wade Wilson gets his 2nd start at QB since 1993 by head coach John Gruden. Buffalo clinches playoff berth with the win. Wade Phillips also gets his first head coaching win vs the Raiders.

Standings

Playoffs

AFC: Miami Dolphins 24, Buffalo Bills 17

Awards and honors 
 Doug Flutie, AFC Pro Bowl Selection
 Doug Flutie, NFL Comeback Player of the Year

References 

 Bills on Pro Football Reference
 Bills on jt-sw.com
 Bills Stats on jt-sw.com

Buffalo Bills seasons
Buffalo Bills
Buff